Le deportate della sezione speciale SS (internationally released as Deported Women of the SS Special Section, SS Special Section Women and Deported Women) is a 1976 Italian erotic-drama film directed by Rino Di Silvestro. The film is considered the first Italian Nazi exploitation film, after the "auteur" progenitors such as Liliana Cavani's art film Il portiere di notte and Tinto Brass' exploitation film Salon Kitty.

Plot
In Nazi Germany, a group of female prisoners are transported by train to an SS concentration camp and subjected to torture by the camp commandant (John Steiner) and his guards which include a lesbian warden. There is also a joint suicide by cyanide capsule of a guard and his inmate lover just before they are forced to make love before the entire camp. Meanwhile the commandant develops an infatuation with a particular inmate, Tania Nobel, who he was in love with before the war and who rejected him in favor of another man, who is later murdered on the orders of the commandant. After initially attempting to starve herself, she feigns falling in love with him. However, following an evening together in the commandant's bedroom, he reveals his plan to escape to South America and in an act of revenge, Tania severs his manhood using a hidden razor blade in her vagina during their love making. During the film's climax whilst allowing the other inmates to escape, she guns down a group of SS guards, only to then be shot herself by one of the fatally wounded guards.

Cast 
 John Steiner: Herr Erner
 Lina Polito: Tania Nobel 
 Erna Schürer: Kapo Helga 
 Sara Sperati: Monique DuPré 
 Solvi Stubing: Fräulein Greta 
 Guido Leontini: Dobermann 
 Stefania D'Amario: Angela Modena 
 Rik Battaglia: Soldier Fredrick

Production
Lina Polito was terrified when she read the script, especially for nude scenes. Rino Di Silvestro told her, and then had him add on her contract, that she would never shoot completely naked, but in the end, on the screen, she would appear as if she were. She had a little coverage, a triangle on her pubis and stars on her nipples. Silvestro filmed it in such a way that these covers were never seen. And she finally looked naked, but she wasn't.

See also    
 List of Italian films of 1976

References

External links

1976 films
1970s erotic drama films
Italian erotic drama films
Nazi exploitation films
1970s exploitation films
Films scored by Stelvio Cipriani
1976 drama films
1970s Italian-language films
1970s Italian films